Allocasuarina tortiramula, commonly known as the twisted sheoak, is a shrub of the genus Allocasuarina native to a small area in the Wheatbelt region of Western Australia.

Typical Size

Habitat
It is found in loam soils over granite.

References

External links
  Occurrence data for Allocasuarina tortiramula from The Australasian Virtual Herbarium

tortiramula
Rosids of Western Australia
Fagales of Australia